Hard sell is an advertisement that uses a  direct, forceful, and overt sales message.

Hard Sell may refer to:

 "Hard Sell" (Beavis and Butt-head episode), a 1994 episode of Beavis and Butt-head
 Hard Sell (TV series), a British reality television series
 The Hard Sell, a 2007 live DJ mix album by DJ Shadow and Cut Chemist
 The Hard Sell (Encore), a 2008 album by DJ Shadow and Cut Chemist
 Hard Sell (film), a 2016 American comedy-drama directed by Sean Nalaboff